
Navidad Lake is a lake in the Beni Department, Bolivia at an elevation of 160 m, with surface area 22.5 km2.

References

Lakes of Beni Department